Finn Christensen (born March 25, 1962) is a former Danish footballer.

Biography 
Finn Christensen played most of his career in Vejle Boldklub. However, in 1984 he played a single season for Ikast FS. The same year Vejle won the Danish Championship.

In the 1990s Finn was captain of a young Vejle Boldklub team that won silver medals in 1997 and played in the UEFA Cup twice. In this period Finn was the gran old man who controlled the game from his midfield position. His big impact on the successful team made him a very popular figure among the fans, who nicknamed him Ferrari Finn.

With 457 matches Finn is number three on the alltime match record list in Vejle Boldklub. Only Gert Eg and Knud Herbert Sørensen have played more games for the club.

External links 
Danish national team profile
Vejle Boldklub - Statistics

1962 births
Living people
Danish men's footballers
Denmark under-21 international footballers
Vejle Boldklub players
Ikast FS players
Association football midfielders